Coin (often stylized as COIN) is an American pop rock band formed in 2012 in Nashville, Tennessee. It currently consists of Chase Lawrence (lead vocals, synthesizers), Ryan Winnen (drums), and Joe Memmel (lead guitar, backing vocals).

The band originally released two EPs in 2012 (Saturdays) and 2013 (1992). They subsequently gained mainstream attention in 2015 with the lead single "Run" from their self-titled debut album, which was produced by Jay Joyce and released later the same year by Columbia.

The group gained further success in 2016 with the lead single "Talk Too Much" from the band's second studio album, How Will You Know If You Never Try, which was released on April 21, 2017. The song was their first to chart on Billboards Alternative Songs chart.

History

2012–2014: Early years 
Coin was formed in 2012 by Chase Lawrence, Ryan Winnen, Joe Memmel, and Zach Dyke. Lawrence, Memmel and Dyke were students at Belmont University. Lawrence and Memmel were classmates who often sat next to each other in music theory classes. After they decided to try writing music together, Winnen and Dyke were introduced to them through mutual friends. The band then decided that they needed recorded music in order for promoters to book them to play live, so they recorded four songs at their school and released them for free on the internet. When they started playing local shows around Nashville, the band quickly attracted a highly enthusiastic and loyal live following. Prior to the release of their debut album, they released two EPs: Saturdays in late 2012, and 1992 in 2013. The song "Atlas" was released as a single in August 2013 from the EP 1992. "Time Machine" was released as a non-album single in October 2013. Both "Atlas" and "Time Machine" were later re-recorded and put on the band's debut album. In March 2014, the band released a re-recorded version of their song, "It's Okay," as a non-album single.

2015: Coin 
The group released their single, "Run," in early 2015 and were hailed by Billboard as "new wave crash-course survivors," destined to "break the Nashville mold." The song received positive reviews, as well as heavy airplay on Sirius' Alt Nation radio station. On June 9, 2015, the band released their self-titled debut album Coin, produced by Jay Joyce. Looking back, the band called the record "precious," as well as admitting "there are a lot of little things that will always be a part of [their] DNA from that album."

2016–2018: How Will You Know if You Never Try 
After touring for the release of their first album, the band released the first single from their second album in May 2016, "Talk Too Much". In February 2017, the band released "I Don't Wanna Dance" as the next single from their forthcoming album. In March 2017, a re-recorded version of their song "Malibu" from their EP 1992 was released as the first promotional single, re-titled "Malibu 1992." Two weeks later on March 23, 2017, the group announced the title of their second album: How Will You Know If You Never Try. Following the announcement of the album, the band released the second promotional single, "Feeling," on March 31, 2017. The album was released worldwide on April 21, 2017.

On February 8, 2018, the single, "Growing Pains", was released as a follow up to the 2017 album. The song features on their tour setlist.

2018–2020: Dreamland 

The next single, "Simple Romance," was released on October 12, 2018. The third single, "Cemetery," debuted on November 16, 2018. The fourth single, "I Want it All," was released on January 10, 2019. The fifth single, presumably the last song before the album, "Crash My Car," debuted on June 13, 2019. Their third album, Dreamland, was released on February 21, 2020.
In 2020, they announced their Dreamland Tour that was set to cover several states across the United States. However, they were forced to postpone several shows on this tour due to the COVID-19 outbreak.

2021–Present: Rainbow Mixtape and Uncanny Valley

On September 18, 2020, Coin returned with a new single, You Are The Traffic. This was the first release from a new EP, Indigo-Violet which released on October 22, 2020. Just three weeks earlier, the band announced a new project titled Rainbow Mixtape which would be 12 songs split into three different EPs that each represented a different color of the rainbow. They described the record as an exploration of "all the colors we can create together," nodding to the project's sonic differences from their older work. One of the key messages of the project is "Don't turn your back on the ones who don't turn their back on you.". 

In September 2021, Coin brought out a new single, Chapstick.  This marked the beginning of a new album cycle, culminating in the March 25 2022 release of the band's fourth studio album, Uncanny Valley, featuring fourteen new songs.

On September 23rd, 2022 on their Uncanny Valley tour, Coin performed their largest show to date at MGM Music Hall at Fenway.

Members 
Current
 Chase Lawrence – lead vocals, synths (2012–present)
 Ryan Winnen – drums (2012–present)
 Joe Memmel –  guitars, backing vocals (2012–present)

Touring
 Matt Martin – bass  (2018–present)

Former
 Zachary Dyke – bass (2012–2018)

Discography

Studio albums

Singles

Music videos

Tours 
Since their formation in 2012, the band has gone on several tours. In 2015, they opened for many artists including Neon Trees and Colony House. They also went on tour that year for the release of their self-titled debut album. In 2016, they continued opening for bands. Some of the groups they toured with include The 1975, Bad Suns, and Saint Motel. After the release of their second album titled How Will You Know If You Never Try, they played 36 shows across the United States. The North American How Will You Know If You Never Try tour occurred during 2017 and 2018. In October 2018, they played three shows in the Philippines as an extension of their previous tour. In February and March 2019, they toured 13 venues on their Paradise of Thought tour. In Summer of 2019, they toured 24 cities, supporting Young the Giant and Fitz and the Tantrums. In Fall of 2019, they went on their Album 3 Part 1 tour where they played 23 locations across the US and Canada. Throughout the years, the band has also played several festivals including Lollapalooza, SandJam Festival, and Music Midtown. On February 24, 2020, it was announced that they would be opening acts for Australian band, 5 Seconds of Summer for the UK arena concert dates on their Take My Hand World Tour. Initially set to take place between May 11, 2020 to May 21, 2020, the UK leg of the tour was postponed due to the coronavirus pandemic. The UK shows began on April 7, 2022 at the SSE Hydro Arena in Glasgow, Scotland, with the band serving as the opening act for eight out of nine shows.

Headlining 

 How Will You Know If You Never Try Tour (2017–2018)
 Paradise of Thought Tour (2019)
 Rainbow Dreamland Tour (2021)
 Uncanny Valley Tour (2022)

Supporting 
 Take My Hand World Tour (2022)

References

External links

 

2012 establishments in Tennessee
Alternative rock groups from Tennessee
Columbia Records artists
Musical groups established in 2012
Musical groups from Nashville, Tennessee